Keawemaʻuhili (1710–1790) was an important member of the Hawaiian nobility at the time of the founding of the Kingdom of Hawaii.

He was a son of Kalaninuiamamao and his half-sister Kekaulike-i-Kawekiuonalani.

He first married Ululani, the Alii Nui of Hilo, and then Kekikipaʻa,  the daughter of Kameʻeiamoku and former wife of Kamehameha I. With his first wife he had sons Keaweokahikiona and Elelule Laakeaelelulu, and with his second wife, famous daughter Kapiolani (c. 1791) and son Koakanu.

His half-brother, King Kalaniʻōpuʻu, died in 1781. He joined with his nephew Keōua Kuahuula in the Battle of Mokuōhai to fight Kamehameha I. He escaped the defeat and returned to Hilo.

References

1790 deaths
Royalty of Hawaii (island)
Hawaiian military personnel
House of Keawe
Year of birth unknown
Date of birth unknown
Date of death unknown